Mackenzie Rosman (born December 28, 1989) is an American actress. She is known for her television role as Ruthie Camden on The WB's long-running drama series 7th Heaven.

Career 
In 1996, Rosman was cast in the role of Ruthie Camden on 7th Heaven after personally greeting each person in the room with a handshake during her audition. In addition to her role on 7th Heaven, Rosman appeared in the independent film Gideon, starring Christopher Lambert, Charlton Heston and Shelley Winters. She has appeared in numerous television commercials starting at age four including a Tuff's Diaper commercial and a Nike shoe commercial.

Rosman played the role of Loreli in the 2009 film The Tomb, loosely based on "Ligeia" by Edgar Allan Poe, alongside Wes Bentley and Kaitlin Doubleday. She also played Jill in the 2008 horror film, Fading of the Cries.

Rosman appeared in four episodes of Brenda Hampton's teen drama The Secret Life of the American Teenager playing Zoe, a student at Grant High School who sleeps with Ricky to get back at Adrian for having sex with Zoe's boyfriend Mac. In 2013, she co-starred in the 2013 horror film Beneath, and in the 2013 television film Ghost Shark. Rosman posed for Maxim magazine in September 2013.

Personal life 
Outside of acting, Rosman enjoys spending time with animals. She owns many horses and is a competitive equestrienne show jumper and rides her horse Mentos Junior in jumping competitions.

Rosman is an active supporter of fundraising for the Cystic Fibrosis Foundation and wishes to educate the public about the need for organ donation. Mackenzie's stepsister, Katelyn Salmont, lived with cystic fibrosis and underwent a successful double lung transplant in late 2005, her father Randy donating one organ. Both girls were featured in Teen People's "20 Teens Who Will Change the World". 7th Heaven produced a special episode about cystic fibrosis titled "Back in the Saddle" which featured Salmont as herself, and Rosman and Salmont rode horses together, as they did at home. In 2005, Salmont reappeared, post-transplant, on 7th Heaven (the episode entitled "X-Mas"), to describe the new life she'd been given. Salmont died of pneumonia and cystic fibrosis on Christmas 2008. Rosman also supports Childhelp Inc. and is an ambassador for the organization, which helps severely abused children. Rosman is also the national honorary chairman for CureFinders, a school fundraising program to help fund the search for a cure for cystic fibrosis.

Rosman graduated from Valencia High School in late May 2007.

In 2022, Rosman gave birth to her daughter.

Filmography

Awards and nominations

References

External links 

 
 Mackenzie Rosman's biography on filmbug
 Mackenzie Rosman (TV IV)
 Mackenzie interview at PBSKids.org

1989 births
20th-century American actresses
21st-century American actresses
Actresses from Charleston, South Carolina
American child actresses
American television actresses
Living people